This is a list of football (soccer) clubs in Curaçao.

 Centro Social Deportivo Barber
 RKSV Centro Dominguito
 Hubentut Fortuna
 CRKSV Jong Colombia
 CRKSV Jong Holland
 S.V. S.U.B.T.
 Deportivo Santa Cruz
 RKV FC SITHOC
 UNDEBA
 S.V. VESTA
 S.V. Victory Boys
 CVV Willemstad
 C.V.C. Zebra's

Curaçao
 
Curaçao-related lists
Lists of organisations based in Curaçao